It Happened in Brooklyn is a 1947 Metro-Goldwyn-Mayer musical romantic comedy film directed by Richard Whorf and starring Frank Sinatra, Kathryn Grayson, Peter Lawford and Jimmy Durante, and featuring Gloria Grahame and Marcy McGuire. It Happened in Brooklyn was Sinatra's third film for Metro-Goldwyn-Mayer, which had purchased his contract from RKO (because Louis B. Mayer was a huge Sinatra fan).

The film contains six songs written by Sammy Cahn and Jule Styne, and included "The Song's Gotta Come From the Heart" (performed as a duet by Sinatra and Durante), "The Brooklyn Bridge", "Whose Baby Are You", "I Believe", "Time After Time", and "It's the Same Old Dream".

Plot
Danny Miller is with a group of GIs awaiting transportation home to the US. On his last night there, he meets Jamie Shellgrove, who is a very shy young man whose grandfather feels should be taken under someone's wing. After observing Miller come to his grandson's aid at the piano, he asks Danny to speak with his son, to give him "some words of encouragement". In order to look good in front of the Brooklyn-born nurse who scolded him for not making friends, he agrees, even going so far as to saying what would really fix Jamie up would be for him to come to Brooklyn. As he rushes out to catch his transport to the docks for the voyage home, Danny discovers that Jamie is really the heir to a duke. Upon Danny's return to Brooklyn, the film revolves around characters realizing their dreams of escaping working-class drudgery: in Sinatra's case to become a singer/musician rather than a shipping clerk, in Lawford's case to break out of his extreme shyness to gain a wife and a career as a songwriter, and in Grayson's case to break out of her school teaching job to star in the opera (although this last is not shown coming to pass, but she presumably lives happily ever after as she is brought to England as the fiancée of the Lawford character, who is heir to a dukedom). The story ends with Danny realizing the nurse he talked to at the start of the film is the only girl for him, and since he figures she's got to be back in Brooklyn herself, and he's got all kinds of friends now, he's optimistic about finding and winning her.

Cast
 Frank Sinatra as Danny Webson Miller
 Kathryn Grayson as Anne Fielding
 Peter Lawford as Jamie Shellgrove
 Jimmy Durante as Nick Lombardi
 Gloria Grahame as Nurse
 Marcy McGuire as Rae Jakobi
 Aubrey Mather as Digby John
 Tamara Shayne as Mrs. Kardos
 William Roy as Leo Kardos (as Billy Roy)
 William Haade as Police Sergeant
 Bobby Long as Johnny O'Brien

Filming
The original director was supposed to be George Sidney, but he was replaced by Richard Whorf, who is probably best known for his television directing, particularly The Beverly Hillbillies, Gunsmoke and My Three Sons.

Filming was interrupted for approximately ten days when Durante had to go and finish filming on This Time for Keeps.

The piano solos for the film were performed by a teenaged André Previn, under the musical direction of Johnny Green. Sinatra’s vocal arrangements were orchestrated by Axel Stordahl.

Box office
The film earned $1,877,000 in the US and Canada and $787,000 elsewhere, resulting a loss of $138,000.

Variety says the film earned $2,150,000 in rentals.

Critical reception
It Happened in Brooklyn was generally well received, Variety noting that: "Much of the lure will result from Frank Sinatra's presence in the cast. Guy's acquired the Bing Crosby knack of nonchalance, throwing away his gag lines with fine aplomb. He kids himself in a couple of hilarious sequences and does a takeoff on Jimmy Durante, with Durante aiding him, that's sockeroo."

References

External links
 
 
 
 
 Review, Variety

1947 films
1947 musical comedy films
1947 romantic comedy films
American musical comedy films
American romantic comedy films
American romantic musical films
American black-and-white films
Films directed by Richard Whorf
Films set in Brooklyn
Films set in England
Films set in New York City
Metro-Goldwyn-Mayer films
1940s English-language films
1940s American films